Jiske Griffioen defeated Aniek van Koot in the final, 4–6, 6–0, 6–4 to win the inaugural ladies' singles wheelchair tennis title at the 2016 Wimbledon Championships.

Seeds

  Jiske Griffioen (champion)
  Yui Kamiji (quarterfinals)

Draw

Finals

References
WC Women's Singles

Women's Wheelchair Singles
Wimbledon Championship by year – Wheelchair women's singles